Joachim Trier (born 1 March 1974) is a Danish-born Norwegian film director, best known for Oslo, August 31st (2011), Louder Than Bombs (2015), Thelma (2017), and The Worst Person in the World (2021). For the latter film, he was nominated for the Best Original Screenplay at the 94th Academy Awards, with the film also being nominated for Best International Feature.

His films have been described as "melancholy meditations concerned with existential questions of love, ambition, memory, and identity."

Early life 
Trier was born in Denmark to Norwegian parents and raised in Oslo, Norway. His father, Jacob Trier, was the sound technician of The Pinchcliffe Grand Prix, a notable film produced in Norway in 1975. His grandfather was Erik Løchen, artistic director of Norsk Film from 1981 to 1983 and also a filmmaker and screenwriter known for such experimental work as his 1972 film Remonstrance which was uniquely constructed so that its five reels could be shown in any order, rendering 120 possible versions of its radical story of a film crew trying to make a political film.

As a teenager, Trier was a skateboarding champion who shot and produced his own skateboarding videos. He studied at the European Film College in Ebeltoft, Denmark and at the National Film & Television School in the United Kingdom.

Career 
Trier's debut film Reprise follows the story of two aspiring writers and their volatile relationship. Released by Miramax  in 2006, it received Norway's top film awards,  the Amanda Award and the Aamot Statuette. Internationally, it won prizes at film festivals in Toronto, Istanbul, Rotterdam, Milan, and Karlovy Vary. He was named one of Variety'''s "10 Directors to Watch" in 2007.

His 2011 film Oslo, August 31st premiered in the Un Certain Regard section at the 2011 Cannes Film Festival. The film is regarded as an adaptation of Louis Malle's The Fire Within. The film received critical acclaim, awards and was featured on several critics' 2012 Top 10 lists.

The director was named as one of the jury members for the "Cinéfondation" and short-film sections of the 2014 Cannes Film Festival.

In 2015, Trier directed the English-language film Louder Than Bombs (2015) starring Jesse Eisenberg, Gabriel Byrne, and Isabelle Huppert. It was selected to compete for the Palme d'Or at the 2015 Cannes Film Festival and was generally well received.

His fourth feature, a  supernatural horror-romance called Thelma, was screened at the 2017 Toronto International Film Festival and was selected as the Norwegian entry for the Best Foreign Language Film at the 90th Academy Awards, held in 2018.

In 2018, he co-directed, with his brother, Emil, a 55-minute documentary, The Other Munch, featuring the writer, Karl Ove Knausgård, curating, with Kari Brandtzaerg, To the Forest, an exhibition of paintings by Edvard Munch at Oslo's Munch Museum. Joachim Trier and Knausgård visit locations from Munch's life, discuss his works, themes, obsessions, and process. The Trier brothers connect Knausgård's unorthodox interpretation of Munch to Knausgård's literary works, in a portrait of both artists.

"When I was invited to curate the exhibition, I proposed that we make a film to coincide with it."—Karl Ove Knausgård

In 2018, he served as the Jury President of the Semaine de la Critique at the 2018 Cannes Film Festival.

On July 7, 2021, The Worst Person in the World premiered to high acclaim in the Palme d'Or competition at the 2021 Cannes Film Festival, where star Renate Reinsve won the Best Actress award. The film was selected as the Norwegian entry for the Best International Feature Film at the 94th Academy Awards.

 Influences 
In 2012, Trier participated in the Sight & Sound critics' poll where he listed his 10 favorite films in alphabetical order:

  2001: A Space Odyssey (USA, 1968)
 8½ (Italy, 1963)
 Annie Hall (USA, 1977)
 Bresson's entire oeuvre
 Goodfellas (USA, 1990)
 Hiroshima Mon Amour (France, 1959)
 Mirror (Russia, 1974)
 La notte (Italy, 1961)
 Persona (Sweden, 1966)
 Vertigo'' (USA, 1958)

Filmography

References

External links 
 
 

1974 births
Alumni of the National Film and Television School
Film directors from Copenhagen
Living people
Norwegian expatriates in Denmark
Norwegian expatriates in England
Norwegian film directors
Norwegian screenwriters